Pamela Jooste (born Cape Town) is a South African novelist. Her first novel, Dance with a Poor Man's Daughter, won the 1998 Commonwealth Writers' Prize, best first book, Africa, and the Sanlam Prize for Fiction.

She worked for Howard Timmins publishers, and BP Southern Africa. 
She is married and lives in Cape Town.

Works
Dance with a Poor Man's Daughter, Doubleday, 1998,  
Frieda and Min, Doubleday, 1999,  
Like Water in Wild Places, Doubleday, 2000,  
People Like Ourselves, Doubleday, 2003,  
Star of the Morning, Doubleday, 2007,

References

External links
"Sonja Loots in conversation with Pamela Jooste", LitNet, 2006-09-09
"Pamela Jooste & Amanda Patterosn", Writers Write, 28 February 2007 
"Whose Dance?: A Review", Southern Africa Report, Vol 14 No 2, March 1999, Carolyn Bassett

South African women novelists
Writers from Cape Town
Living people
Year of birth missing (living people)